F94 or F-94 may refer to:
 , a Type 22 frigate of the Royal Navy
 , a Blackwood-class anti-submarine frigate of the Royal Navy
 Lockheed F-94 Starfire, an American interceptor aircraft
 Scania F94, a series of front engine buses